Bekir İrtegün (born 20 April 1984) is a former Turkish professional football player who last played for Sakaryaspor.

Career

Club career
On 8 June 2009, İrtegün transferred to Turkish giants Fenerbahçe on a three-year deal.

İstanbul Başakşehir
On 1 July 2015, İrtegün agreed with İstanbul Başakşehir on a three + one years.

International career
İrtegün has represented Turkey since youth level, he has played for the under-15 team, the under-16 team, the under-19 team, the under-20 team and the under-21 team.

On 2 June 2012, İrtegün made his debut for the senior team in a 3-1 victory over Portugal in a Friendly.

Honours

Club
 Fenerbahçe
 Süper Lig (2): 2010–11, 2013–14
 Turkish Cup (2): 2011–12, 2012–13
 Turkish Super Cup (2): 2009, 2014

Prosecution 
In the aftermath of the attempted coup d'etat of July 2016 he was charged of being a member of the Gülen movement. In January 2020 İrtegün was sentenced to 2 years and 3 months imprisonment for being a member of an armed terror organization due to his links to the Gülen movement.

References

External links
 
 
 
 
 
 

1984 births
Living people
Turkish footballers
Turkey international footballers
Turkey under-21 international footballers
Turkey youth international footballers
Süper Lig players
TFF First League players
Fenerbahçe S.K. footballers
Gaziantepspor footballers
İstanbul Başakşehir F.K. players
Sakaryaspor footballers
Association football central defenders
Kurdish sportspeople
People from Elazığ
Mediterranean Games silver medalists for Turkey
Mediterranean Games medalists in football
Competitors at the 2005 Mediterranean Games
Turkish prisoners and detainees